Vileyka reservoir is a water reservoir in the Vileyka-Minsk water system. It is the largest artificial lake in Belarus.

Description 

Vileyka reservoir is the largest artificial reservoir of Belarus, second in size to the largest natural lake, Narach. It has a surface area of 64.6 km2, a length of 27 km, a width of 3 km, a maximum depth of 13 m, an average volume of 238 million cubic meters. Catchment area is 4120 square kilometers, mineralization of water - 280–320 mg/L.

History 
The Vileyka reservoir construction was started in 1968. The reservoir was created to increase the amount of fresh water for the republic's capital Minsk. For this purpose it was necessary to transfer some of the large Belarusian river's flow into the river Svislach. Along with the construction of the reservoir was built the Vileyka water channel through which water from the Viliya (Neris) and from the Svislach passed east of the reservoir. The water rises to the level of more than 70 meters with a few Hydraulic power station. The Viliya river was dammed in 1973, and in early 1975 water from the reservoir went through the channel to the capital, Minsk. The annual transfer of water is 575 million tons.

References

See also 
Vileyka
Viliya (Neris)

Reservoirs in Europe
Lakes of Belarus